Andrea Betzner and Claudia Porwik were the defending champions but did not compete that year.

Sabrina Goleš and Mercedes Paz won in the final 6–2, 6–2 against Sophie Amiach and Emmanuelle Derly.

Seeds
Champion seeds are indicated in bold text while text in italics indicates the round in which those seeds were eliminated.

 Sabrina Goleš /  Mercedes Paz (champions)
 Sophie Amiach /  Emmanuelle Derly (final)
 Julie Halard /  Sandra Wasserman (first round)
 Frédérique Martin /  Caterina Nozzoli (quarterfinals)

Draw

External links
 1989 Mantegazza Cup Doubles Draw

Ilva Trophy
1989 WTA Tour